Kathleen Margret Bailey (born 31 January 1950) is a former Norfolk Islands international lawn bowler.

Bowls career
Bailey made her international debut in 1994 and has represented the Norfolk Islands at three Commonwealth Games; at the 2002 Commonwealth Games, the 2006 Commonwealth Games and the 2010 Commonwealth Games.

She won a bronze medal at the 2003 Asia Pacific Bowls Championships.

References

External links
  (2006–2010)
 

1950 births
Living people
Norfolk Island bowls players
Norfolk Island sportspeople
Bowls players at the 2002 Commonwealth Games
Bowls players at the 2006 Commonwealth Games
Bowls players at the 2010 Commonwealth Games